Scevesia is a genus of moths of the family Notodontidae erected by Harrison Gray Dyar Jr. in 1916.

Species
Scevesia angustiora (Barnes & McDunnough, 1910)
Scevesia broidricci (Dyar, 1916)

References

Notodontidae